The Ukraine Yellow Kitchen Photo is a 2023 photo by Yan Dobronosov that captures the aftermath of the 2023 Dnipro residential building airstrike that hit the home of boxing coach Mykhailo Korenovsky.

It was widely shared online in January 2023.

Background 
Mykhailo Korenovsky (Ukrainian: Михайло  Кореновський) was the boxing coach for Dnipropetrovsk Oblast and lived in the 9-story housing block with his wife Olga and their two daughters.

Description and circulation 
The Ukraine Yellow Kitchen Photo is a drone image taken by Yan Dobronosov on January 15, 2023. The image captures the devastation caused by the 2023 Dnipro residential building airstrike that fatally struck the kitchen of the Korenovsky family. The image was widely shared online in January 2023. The Ukrainian Army stated that the strike was delivered from a X-22 Russian missile.

Mykhailo Korenovsky died in the strike, Olga and their daughters were out for a walk at the time and survived.

Critical reception 
The images provoked contemplation from social media users. Commenting on the photo, member of the Ukrainian Parliament Zoya Yarosh wrote "Here people cooked, had kitchen conversations, celebrated holidays, laughed, argued...These are the wounds on the body of Ukraine. Wounds on our homes."

References

2020s photographs
Color photographs
Photography in Ukraine
War photography